Jacob Bendien (1890–1933), was a Dutch painter and graphic artist.

Biography
He was born in Amsterdam but moved to Paris in 1911 where he met and worked with the sculptor-painter John Rädecker and the painter Jan van Deene. With them he later started making "Absolute schilderkunst", or "Absolute art", a form of abstract art that grew from their combined Amsterdam art show for the "De Onafhankelijken" (the Amsterdam "Independents" art club) in 1913.

According to the RKD he was the uncle of Eva Bendien, who later started the Galerie Espace, a modern art gallery in Haarlem and Amsterdam.

He died in Hilversum of tuberculosis.

References

Jacob Bendien on Artnet
Jacob Bendien, 1890–1933 : een herinneringsboek, by Paul Citroen, 1940
Richtingen in de hedendaagsche schilderkunst, by Jacob Bendien and Ans Harrenstein-Schräder, Brusse's uitgeversmaatschappij, 1935

1890 births
1933 deaths
Painters from Amsterdam
Artists from Paris
20th-century Dutch painters
Dutch male painters
20th-century Dutch male artists